Gary Smith (born 30 June 1947) is a former Australian rules footballer who played with Carlton in the Victorian Football League (VFL).

Notes

External links 

Lawson-Smith's profile at Blueseum

Carlton Football Club players
Central District Football Club players
Australian rules footballers from South Australia
1947 births
Living people